U.S. Route 10 Alternate may refer to:

 U.S. Route 10 Alternate (Seattle, Washington), a former designation for a part of state highway Washington State Route 900
 U.S. Route 10 Alternate (Washington–Montana), a former U.S. Route that ran from Seattle to Montana
 U.S. Route 10 Alternate (Drummond–Anaconda, Montana), a former designation of state highway Montana Highway 1

10 Alternate
Alternate
10 Alternate